"Hero" is a single performed by American singer-songwriter David Crosby from his third studio album, Thousand Roads (1993). The recording features English drummer Phil Collins, who co-wrote the song with Crosby, produced it, sang backing vocals, and played drums, keyboards, and drum machine. Collins released a demo version, featuring his vocals only, as a B-side to the "We Wait and We Wonder" single release.

B-sides
"Coverage" is an album track written by Bonnie Hayes, a cover of a song she recorded for her 1982 album, Good Clean Fun. "Fare Thee Well" is a non-album track written by Emily Saliers, who later recorded the song with her band Indigo Girls for their 1994 album, Swamp Ophelia.

Track listing
 "Hero" (LP version) – 4:39
 "Coverage" (LP version) – 3:22
 "Fare Thee Well" – 4:07

Charts

Weekly charts

Year-end charts

Release history

References

1993 singles
1993 songs
Atlantic Records singles
Phil Collins songs
Songs written by David Crosby
Songs written by Phil Collins